Blooze is an EP by the former Guns N' Roses guitarist Gilby Clarke, released in 1995. The EP was a limited run for the Japanese market.

Track listing 
 "Tijuana Jail" (Live) – 9:29
 "Melting My Cold Heart" – 3:37
 "Life's a Gas" – 2:27
 "He's a Whore" – 2:44 
 "Skin & Bones" (Plugged) – 3:17

Personnel 
 Gilby Clarke - lead guitar, lead vocals
 Marc Danzeisen - drums, backing vocals
 Will Effertz - bass, backing vocals
 Ryan Roxie - guitar
 Eric Scotis, Dean Clark, Kenneth - additional backing vocals

References 
 

Gilby Clarke albums
1995 debut EPs
Geffen Records EPs